Ute Schell ( Stange then Wagner, born 2 April 1966) is a German rower, who competed for the SG Dynamo Potsdam / Sportvereinigung (SV) Dynamo. She has won several medals at international rowing competitions. She was first coached by Herta Weissig and then Wolfgang Schell.

She first competed under her maiden name Stange up until the 1988 Olympics; in November 1988 she received a Patriotic Order of Merit in gold under her first married name Wagner. In 1995 she married her coach Schell. She competed at the 1996 Olympics under her second married name Schell.

References

External links

1966 births
Living people
Olympic medalists in rowing
East German female rowers
German female rowers
Rowers at the 1988 Summer Olympics
Rowers at the 1992 Summer Olympics
Rowers at the 1996 Summer Olympics
Olympic gold medalists for East Germany
Olympic bronze medalists for Germany
Olympic rowers of Germany
Medalists at the 1992 Summer Olympics
Medalists at the 1988 Summer Olympics
World Rowing Championships medalists for East Germany
World Rowing Championships medalists for Germany
People from Hildburghausen (district)
Recipients of the Patriotic Order of Merit in gold
Sportspeople from Thuringia